Md. Sabbir Hossain Mishu, known by his stage name Mishu Sabbir is a Bangladeshi television and  actor and model.

Early life 
He was born on 28 October 1982. He hailed from Dhaka, Bangladesh. He received his education from Independent University Bangladesh in computer science.

Career
Sabbir performed in Lal Tip (2012), a big budget film of Impress Telefilm Limited.

Works

Films
 Lal Tip (2012)
 Valobasha Emoni Hoy (2016)
 To Be Continued (2017) as Mac

Drama, telefilm, mini-series and TV series
 Housefull (2008) as Mishu
 Behind The Scene
 Biporitey Ami (2008) as Akmol
 Hello (2009) as Kashem
 Graduate (2010) as Ayub
 Jimmi (2010) as Mishu
 Denmohor 
 Idiots (2012)
 Radio Chocolate
 College
 @18: All Time Dourer Upor (2013) as Baby Bappi
 Moneybag (2013) as Pilot
 Faad O Bogar Golpo
 Bhalobasha 101 (2014) as Mishu
 Vitamin-T (2014) as Bulbul aka BB
 Selfiebazz (2015)
 Haar Naki Jeet (2016)
 House 44
 Cheleta Kintu Valo Chilo (2017)
 Chabial Reunion (2017)
 Journey by Launch (2017)
 Karsaji
 Bachelor Point (2018; Present) as Shuvo
 Arekti Shondeher Golpo (2019)
 Cholo Palai (2019)
 Bachelor DJ Party (2019)
 Network Busy (2019)
 Bachelor Trip (2019)
 Bachelor Eid (2019)
 Stadium (2020) as Zubayerullah Zafor aka Jojo
 Twist (2020)
 Bachelor Quarantine (2020)
 Nakshi (2021)
 Female (2021) as Body Sohel
 The Beggar (2021)
 Thanda (2021)
 Hoichoi Paribaar (2021)
 Mone Korone Moron (2022)
 Doi (2022)
 Bachelor's Ramadan (2022)
 Good Buzz (2022) Female 2 '' (2022)

References

External links 

 
Mishu Sabbir at Facebook

Living people
Bangladeshi male television actors
Bangladeshi male film actors
Year of birth missing (living people)
Place of birth missing (living people)